Operation Shed was a British plan for military intervention in Zanzibar following the 1964 Zanzibar revolution.  It was one of a series of operations devised by the British to be implemented in the case of an attempt to seize power from President Abeid Karume by the radical left-wing Umma Party.  Shed succeeded the earlier Operations Parthenon and Boris and was an alternative to Operation Finery.  Shed would have involved an airlift of a battalion of troops to Unguja to provide support to Karume and to protect European citizens.  The risk of a coup passed by 29 April 1964 and it was determined that any intervention would be opposed by Karume's forces and a Soviet training team.  With this in mind Shed was modified on 9 June to an airborne assault by Royal Marine commandos from HMS Centaur, which would then be supported by the landing of a battalion and armoured cars from Kenya.  The continuing presence of British and friendly nationals in Zanzibar complicated the matter and, around 23 September 1964, Shed was replaced by Plan Giralda.

Background 
The Zanzibar Revolution had occurred on 12 January 1964 and since then British forces had kept a presence in the area to safeguard European citizens.  Since 30 January British forces had also been kept on standby to launch a military intervention in the event that the radical left-wing Umma Party staged a coup to overthrow President Abeid Karume's moderate Afro-Shirazi Party which controlled the governing Revolutionary Council.  Operation Shed was the fourth British plan for this eventuality, following Operations Parthenon, Boris and Finery.  Parthenon and Boris had been cancelled by the time that Shed was designed and Shed was to act as a supporting operation to Finery.  Finery would have involved a helicopter assault by Royal Marines from the commando carrier HMS Bulwark.  However, Bulwark was required for operations in the Middle East and so Finery could only be launched following 14 days notice. In addition, the merger of Zanzibar and Tanganyika to form Tanzania on 23 April had raised concerns in the British commanders that the Umma Party would launch a coup to prevent the merger which would limit their power.  Shed was designed as a contingency plan to provide a quicker response if it seemed likely that the Umma Party could stage a coup quicker than Finery could be launched or if British citizens were in immediate danger.

Operation 
Shed would have entailed the airlift of a battalion of British troops to Unguja, the main base of revolutionary power, to provide support to Karume and any forces loyal to him.  The primary objectives were to seize the airfield and other strategic locations, protect Karume and his government, protect British and European citizens and to disarm any forces which were a threat to Karume.  The operation was planned on the basis that troops would only be sent with the agreement of Karume and that their disembarkation would be unopposed.  The Commonwealth Relations Office had sought to persuade the Nigerian government to support Shed with additional troops but had been turned down.

Aftermath 

By 29 April the danger of a coup had passed so Operation Finery was scrapped and Shed stepped down to 24 hours readiness.  On 21 May the Chiefs of Staff acknowledged that Karume's agreement probably would not be gained and that a landing may be opposed.  Intelligence sources also stated that Karume's 300-strong police force were now outnumbered by other security forces of unknown loyalties and that elements of the Zanzibari Army and a Soviet training team guarded the airfield by night.  The Zanzibari army was known to be in possession of light anti-aircraft guns, heavy machine guns, 120 mm mortars and 57 mm anti-tank guns.  Karume's police were also expected to side with the army against any foreign intervention unless specifically ordered not to by Karume.  A 300 strong Tanganyikan police unit was already on the island to keep the peace and was expected to support the British intervention, however it was of negligible use as a fighting unit.  In light of this information Shed was modified on 9 June to an airborne assault by Royal Marine commandos from HMS Centaur which would then be supported by the landing of the battalion and armoured cars from Kenya.  Despite these modifications the Minister of Defence, Peter Thorneycroft, stated that losses amongst British and Zanzibari forces would likely be high if the plan went ahead.  The continuing presence of 87 British citizens and 40 "friendly nationals" in the country also complicated matters as British troops would be expected to protect these civilians from violence.  Thus Shed was replaced by Plan Giralda around 23 September 1964.

References

Bibliography 
.
.

History of Zanzibar
Shed
1964 in military history
1964 in Zanzibar